Sam Davies (born 6 October 1993) is a Wales international rugby union player who plays for the Dragons RFC

Career
Davies made his debut for the Ospreys in 2012. He joined the Dragons for the 2019–20 season on a two-year deal.

International
In April 2012, he was named in the Wales Under-20 squad for the Junior World Cup in South Africa.

In January 2013, he was selected in the Wales Under 20 squad for the 2013 Under 20 Six Nations Championship.

In June 2013, Davies was named IRB Junior Player of the Year

On 5 November 2016, he made his senior debut for Wales versus Australia as a second-half replacement.

On 19 November 2016, he was substituted on to kick a drop goal versus Japan for the win.

On 5 February 2017, Davies played as fly-half for the whole of the second half of Wales versus Italy on the first weekend of the 2017 Six Nations Championship.

Personal
Sam Davies is the son of former Wales caretaker head coach Nigel Davies.

References

External links 
 Swansea profile
 Dragons RFC profile

Living people
1993 births
Rugby union players from Swansea
Welsh rugby union players
Wales international rugby union players
Ospreys (rugby union) players
Dragons RFC players
Rugby union fly-halves